Susie Cagle is an American journalist and editorial cartoonist whose work has appeared in The American Prospect, AlterNet, The Awl, GOOD, and others. Cagle is based in Oakland, California.

She has reported on subjects including the experience of living in California's "wildfire country" and the effect of climate change on drought cycles, Drug Enforcement Administration raids of California medical marijuana facilities, the emergence of "sharing economy" start-up companies as a form of "disaster capitalism," and the Occupy Oakland portion of Occupy Wall Street.

Early life and education 
Cagle is the daughter of editorial cartoonist Daryl Cagle. She went to high school in Calabasas, California, and is a graduate of the University of California, Santa Barbara's College of Creative Studies (2005) and the Columbia University Graduate School of Journalism (2006).

Career 
She was a cartoonist at The San Francisco Appeal from 2010 to 2011, and later worked as a staff writer and illustrator at Grist.

Despite holding a press pass while covering Occupy Oakland, Cagle was arrested on two separate occasions—making her the first professional journalist to be arrested more than once while covering Occupy-related events. After her first arrest, the Society of Professional Journalists sent a letter to the Oakland Police Department condemning the action. Her second arrest occurred during a kettle at an Occupy Oakland event. At the time, she carried an active press credential from the Freelancers' Guild and an expired press credential issued by the Oakland Police Department.

Cagle's work was the subject of a solo show at San Francisco Cartoon Art Museum in 2012. She was selected by the International Women's Media Foundation for a 2013 Women Entrepreneurs in the Digital News Frontier grant.

She has a John S. Knight Journalism fellowship at Stanford University for 2015-16, with a focus on "How can we better support the growing field of professional media freelancers?"

References

External links 
 
 
 
 LocalWiki: Oakland: Susie Cagle
 Prison Legal News: articles by Susie Cagle

American editorial cartoonists
American women journalists
Artists from Oakland, California
Artists from the San Francisco Bay Area
Columbia University Graduate School of Journalism alumni
Living people
People from Calabasas, California
People from Oakland, California
Artists from Stamford, Connecticut
University of California, Santa Barbara alumni
Writers from the San Francisco Bay Area
Year of birth missing (living people)
21st-century American women